Vasil Dimitrov Radev (born 13 January 1961) is a Bulgarian rower.

Radev was born in Ihtiman in 1961. He won a gold medal at the 1987 World Rowing Championships in Copenhagen with the men's double sculls. He competed at the 1988 Summer Olympics in Seoul in double sculls partnered with Daniel Yordanov, where they came eighth.

References

1961 births
Living people
Bulgarian male rowers
World Rowing Championships medalists for Bulgaria
Rowers at the 1988 Summer Olympics
Olympic rowers of Bulgaria
People from Ihtiman
Sportspeople from Sofia Province